Steven Weir (born 3 October 1988) is a Scottish Junior footballer who plays as a striker for Junior League Side Fauldhouse United club Fauldhouse.

Career
Born in Harthill, Scotland, he started his career with Livingston, where he also spent a spell on loan at Cowdenbeath. He joined Arbroath before moving to Australia where he played for North Eastern Soccer League side, Shepparton South. He scored 28 goals in 12 games in his first season with the club, and played his first match for the team four hours after arriving in Australia.

In January 2011 he returned to Scotland, during the Australian summer break, where he joined East Fife, playing into two matches. He then returned to Australia where he joined Victorian Premier League side Hume City.

In August 2012, Weir signed for Scottish club Stirling Albion on a short-term contract. He left Stirling Albion to sign for Junior side Broxburn Athletic in January 2013 when his short-term contract expired.

He joined Penicuik Athletic in September 2014. His left the club at the end of the season to join Armadale Thistle.

His brother is Graham Weir, who is also a footballer who plays for Junior team Linlithgow Rose.

References

External links

Scottish footballers
Scottish Football League players
Livingston F.C. players
Cowdenbeath F.C. players
Dumbarton F.C. players
Arbroath F.C. players
1988 births
Living people
East Fife F.C. players
Hume City FC players
Stirling Albion F.C. players
South Melbourne FC players
Scottish expatriate footballers
Expatriate soccer players in Australia
Footballers from North Lanarkshire
Whitburn Junior F.C. players
Association football forwards
Scottish expatriate sportspeople in Australia
Scottish Junior Football Association players
Arthurlie F.C. players
Fauldhouse United F.C. players
Armadale Thistle F.C. players
Penicuik Athletic F.C. players
Broxburn Athletic F.C. players